Streak or streaking may refer to:
Streaking, running naked in a public place
Streaking or surfactant leaching in acrylic paints
Streaking (microbiology), a method of purifying micro-organisms
Streak (mineralogy), the color left by a mineral dragged across a rough surface
Streak (moth), in the family Geometridae
Streak (film), a 2008 film
Winning streak, consecutive wins in sport or gambling
Losing streak
The Streak (professional wrestling), a run of victories for The Undertaker at WrestleMania
The Streak (Easton High School Wrestling), a Pennsylvania, US, high-school streak
Iron man (sports streak), an athlete of unusual physical endurance 
Hitting streak, in baseball, a consecutive amount of games in which a player appears and gets at least one base hit. 
Dell Streak, tablet computer by Dell
Streak camera, device to measure short optical pulses
"The Streak" (song), a 1974 record by Ray Stevens
Archenteron, an indentation on a blastula
Heath Streak, former Zimbabwe cricket team captain
Aero-Flight Streak, a late 1940s single engine civilian aircraft
Streak (company) is a private American company founded in 2011 and based in San Francisco, California

See also
 Streaker (disambiguation)